São Pedro is a former civil parish in the municipality of Porto de Mós, Portugal. The population in 2011 was 2,879, in an area of 14.98 km2. On 28 January 2013 it merged with São João Batista to form Porto de Mós. It's home to the Castelo de Porto de Mós.

References 

Former parishes of Porto de Mós